Casasimarro is a  municipality in the Province of Cuenca, in the autonomous community of Castile-La Mancha, Spain.

, the municipality had a population of just over 3,000. The area of Casasimarro is about 50 km.[2]

The local economy is based on agriculture and cattle raising, with the main produce being mushrooms, cereals, wine and olive oil. Industries include guitar- and carpet-making.

Casasimarro is a relatively new municipality. The oldest document that acknowledges it, is Felipe II's "Relación Topográfica" in 1598. This document states the foundation of a village of the "House of the Simarros" ("Casa de los Simarro") in 1470.

References

2. https://www.citypopulation.de/php/spain-castillalamancha.php?cityid=16066, Retrieved Dec. 5th, 2019.

Municipalities in the Province of Cuenca